The Madison Elementary School District is an elementary school district in Phoenix, Arizona. It operates eight schools and was founded in 1890.

Elementary schools
Camelview
Heights
Rose Lane
Simis
Traditional

Middle schools

Madison No. 1
Meadows
Park
Traditional

School of choice
Madison Traditional Academy

References

External links
 Official website

School districts in Phoenix, Arizona
School districts in Maricopa County, Arizona